Nano Letters is a monthly peer-reviewed scientific journal published by the American Chemical Society. It was established in January 2001. The editor-in-chief is Teri W. Odom (Northwestern University). The journal covers all aspects of nanoscience and nanotechnology and their subdisciplines.

Abstracting and indexing 
The journal is currently abstracted and indexed in Chemical Abstracts Service, Scopus, EBSCOhost, Index Medicus/MEDLINE/PubMed, Science Citation Index, and Current Contents/Physical, Chemical & Earth Sciences.

References

External links 
 

American Chemical Society academic journals
Nanotechnology journals
Publications established in 2001
Monthly journals
English-language journals